Wainscot is a panelling, often wooden, applied to an interior wall of a building.

Wainscot may also refer to:

Moths
Family Crambidae
Wainscot grass-veneer, Eoreuma densellus

Family Gelechiidae
Wainscot neb, Monochroa palustrellus

Family Noctuidae

Family Ypsolophidae
Wainscot hooktip, Ypsolopha scabrella
Wainscot smudge, Ypsolopha scabrella

Other uses 

 Wainscot chair, a type of chair common in early 17th-century England and colonial America
 Wainscot society, a speculative fiction trope involving an invisible or undetected society

See also 
 Wainscott (disambiguation)